The Portland Cordage Company Building is a building located in northwest Portland, Oregon, that is listed on the National Register of Historic Places.

See also
 National Register of Historic Places listings in Northwest Portland, Oregon

References

1887 establishments in Oregon
Industrial buildings and structures on the National Register of Historic Places in Portland, Oregon
Industrial buildings completed in 1887
Italianate architecture in Oregon
Pearl District, Portland, Oregon